Birkenhead was a New Zealand Parliamentary electorate on Auckland's North Shore from 1969 to 1996, when it was absorbed into the Northcote electorate.

Population centres
Through an amendment in the Electoral Act in 1965, the number of electorates in the South Island was fixed at 25, an increase of one since the 1962 electoral redistribution. It was accepted that through the more rapid population growth in the North Island, the number of its electorates would continue to increase, and to keep proportionality, three new electorates were allowed for in the 1967 electoral redistribution for the next election. In the North Island, five electorates were newly created (including Birkenhead) and one electorate was reconstituted while three electorates were abolished. In the South Island, three electorates were newly created and one electorate was reconstituted while three electorates were abolished. The overall effect of the required changes was highly disruptive to existing electorates, with all but three electorates having their boundaries altered.

This suburban electorate was on the North Shore of Auckland. Most of its original area had previously been with the  electorate. It was absorbed into the Northcote electorate.

History
He was the first representatives for the Birkenhead electorate when it was created for the 1969 election.

The electorate was abolished in the 1996 election, the first mixed-member proportional (MMP) election.

Members of Parliament
Key

Election results

1993 election

1990 election

1987 election

1984 election

1981 election

1978 election

1975 election

1972 election

1969 election

Notes

References

Historical electorates of New Zealand
1969 establishments in New Zealand
1996 disestablishments in New Zealand